Events from the year 1882 in Russia.

Incumbents
 Monarch – Alexander III

Events

 
 
  
  
 Tcherny railway accident
 May Laws
 Pavlovka (meteorite)
 Peasants' Land Bank

Births
January 4 – Aristarkh Lentulov, painter and set designer (died 1943)
June 17 – Igor Stravinsky,  composer, pianist, and conductor (died 1971)
June 22 – Nikolai Cholodny, microbiologist (died 1953)

Deaths

  - Friedrich Benjamin von Lütke, Russian navigator, geographer, and Arctic explorer. (b. 1797)

References

1882 in Russia
Years of the 19th century in the Russian Empire